Magen David Synagogue is an Orthodox Sephardi synagogue located in  Byculla, India.

History
Erected in 1864, the synagogue was constructed by David Sassoon in Victorian style for the growing population of Baghdadi Jews who had fled from persecution by the governor and Wali of Baghdad Dawud Pasha. By 1910, the Jewish community in the neighbourhood of Byculla had increased to the extent that the synagogue could no longer service all the devotees and the synagogue was extended with the help of Jacob, David Sassoon's grandson.

Legacy
The synagogue is one of the largest in Asia outside of Israel.

Within the extensive grounds of the Synagogue there are two Jewish Schools which are operated by the Sir Jacob Sassoon High School Trust and the E.E.E. Sassoon High School Trust, in which Jewish children were originally educated. Over time most of the Bagdadi Jews moved to the more affluent Colaba area or abroad to Israel, Australia, Britain and Canada. With the scarcity of Jewish students, the Schools have opened to all communities and currently provide for the population in the vicinity, which is 98% Muslim.

In 2011, for the celebration of the 150th anniversary, the Synagogue was restored.

Gallery

See also
 David Sassoon

References

Orthodox Judaism in India
Orthodox synagogues
Synagogues in Mumbai
Iraqi-Jewish diaspora in Asia
Synagogues completed in 1864
Sephardi Jewish culture in India
Sephardi synagogues
1864 establishments in India